The Sudetendeutsche Landsmannschaft is an organization representing Sudeten German expellees and refugees from the Sudetenland in Czechoslovakia. Most of them were forcibly expelled and deported to western Allied occupation zones of Germany, which would later form West Germany, from their homelands inside Czechoslovakia during the expulsion of Germans after World War II.

The charter was signed in Stuttgart in 1950 and committed the organization to the renouncing of revenge and retaliation and promoting European accord. The organization tried to slow down the membership of today's Czech Republic in the European Union by demanding a complete revocation of the Beneš decrees which established the expulsion of Germans from Czechoslovakia after the war and declared them unlawful.

The Landsmannschaft is currently based in Munich, Bavaria. Its chairman is Bernd Posselt. It is a member of the Federation of Expellees (Bund der Vertriebenen, BdV). In 1950 the Homeland Association already vowed to reject any form of violence and revenge.

See also 
 Landsmannschaft (Studentenverbindung)

External links 
 Sudetendeutsche Landsmannschaft, branch in Germany 
 Sudetendeutsche Landsmannschaft in Österreich, branch in Austria 
 SL New York / SL USA
  Brasilien/Brazil 
 Sudetendeutsche Landsmannschaft in Argentina 
 Sudetendeutscher-Tag.de 
  SdJ – Jugend für Mitteleuropa e.V. (SdJ = Sudetendeutsche Jugend), youth organization in Germany 
 Sudetendeutsche Jugend Österreichs, youth organization in Austria 
 Sudetendeutsche Landsmannschaft, Landesgruppe Bayern 

Organizations established in 1950
Landsmannschaften
Sudeten German people
Sudetenland
1950 establishments in West Germany